Abû ‘Umar ibn Sa’îd (died c. 1287) was son of Abû 'Uthmân Sa'îd ibn Hakam al Qurashi and last ra’îs of Manûrqa (1282–1287).

In his first year in government, King Peter III of Aragon and his fleet  stopped by Manurqa on their way to the city of Constantine (North Africa). Bugron, the Lord of Constantine, had secretly plotted with Peter to convert to Christianity and surrender the city to the Crown of Aragon. According to Ramon Muntaner’s Cronica, Abû ‘Umar sent messengers to North Africa letting know of this plot. The consequences  were that Bugron was executed and Peter’s surprise invasion was discovered.

Years later, Peter and King James II of Majorca, (Menorca’s vassal lord) came into a dispute. Peter’s son King Alfons III of Aragon set out from Salou on 22 November 1286 with an invasion force against Manûrqa. This was both to avenge Abû ‘Umar ibn Sa’îd and James II. He arrived on 5 January 1287. Abû ‘Umar ibn Sa’îd  prepared himself with mercenary troops from North Africa. The first battle took place on 17 January. Alfons won this battle and  Abû ‘Umar ibn Sa’îd and a few of his followers fled to the  fortress near Madina al Jazira, nowadays known as the fortress of Santa Àgueda.

On 21 January, Abû ‘Umar ibn Sa’îd, seeing himself outnumbered, signed his surrender with the treaty of San Agayz. He was allowed to leave the island towards North Africa, with two hundred of his followers, the remains of his father, his library and fifty swords. Alfons chartered him a ship manned by a Genoese, which according to Muntaner, encountered a storm off the North African coast and was destroyed. There were no survivors.

Notes
Arabic Chief, leader.

Sources 
Ramón Muntaner,  Chronicle, tr. Lady Goodenough (available in PDF format).

History of Menorca
Oriental islands of Al-Andalus
13th-century people from al-Andalus
1287 deaths
Year of birth unknown